Lee Do-yeop (born on April 11, 1972) is a South Korean theater actor and director. As an actor he also does various supporting roles in television and film. He’s known as scene stealer in dramas such as The Uncanny Counter, Run On, and Hometown Cha-Cha-Cha

Career

Lee Do-yeop is a well-known actor and director in the theater industry. He directed The Guy Meets Her (2007), a modern take on Anton Chekhov's one-act comedy. He also directed The Proposal (2011), another modern take of Anton Chekov work.

Lee Do-yeop is also famous for his family CF that won Korean Advertising Award in 2009. A documentary type of advertisement that contains the process of giving birth to a life, putting it out to the world, and growing a mother with a baby.

Actor Lee Do-yeop signed an exclusive contract with Fn Entertainment on February 26, 2020.

Personal life 
Lee Do-yeop married theater actress Jeon Su-ah in January 2008, his juniors at Sejong University. They got into relationship after appearing together in the play A Beauty Salon for 10 Pyeong, and got married after six months of dating. Their son, Lee Si-hoo was born on December 27, 2008, and his birth were documented in advertisement by Woongjin Coway. The documentary style ad contains the process of giving birth to a life, putting it out to the world, and growing a mother with a baby.

Woongjin Coway posted an advertisement for public advertisement models scheduled to give birth in December 2008 on childcare information sites, childcare magazines, and obstetrics and gynecology, and more than 200 pairs applied. Three couples were selected through a judging process. Taking into account the unpredictable circumstances, all three couples were filmed, and the only one who gave birth through natural childbirth was the couple Lee Do-yeop and Jeon Su-ah. Baby Lee Si-hoo, was well loved, he nick-named as nation baby.

Filmography

Film

Television

Stage

As theater actor

As theater director

Award

Notes

References

External links 

 
Lee Do-yeop at Daum Movie 
Lee Do-yeop at Daum Encyclopedia 
Lee Do-yeop at Naver 
Lee Do-yeop at PlayDB 
Lee Do-yeop at FN Entertainment 

Living people
People from Daegu
1972 births
21st-century South Korean male actors
South Korean male stage actors
South Korean male television actors
South Korean male film actors